is a Japanese musician and composer. Growing up, Takahashi was a fan of American rock band The Ventures, which inspired him to take a musical career, and university inspired him to become a composer, which he was given his first lead role in with Please Tell Me! Galko-chan in 2016. Since 2016, he has done music composition for various series, such as ACCA: 13-Territory Inspection Dept. and SK8 the Infinity. Under the name Void_Chords, he has performed theme songs for Two Car, Princess Principal, and Arifureta: From Commonplace to World's Strongest.

Biography
Ryo Takahashi was born on November 1, 1985. Growing up, Takahashi was a fan of American rock band The Ventures, which would inspire him to pursue a musical career. While in university, Takahashi studied musical composition, which would influence him to become a composer. In 2016, he made his debut as lead composer with the anime adaptation of Please Tell Me! Galko-chan.

In 2017, he composed the music for the anime adaptation of ACCA: 13-Territory Inspection Dept. and as Void_Chords the opening for Princess Principal. At the Crunchyroll Anime Awards, the former was nominated for best soundtrack and the latter for best opening theme.

Works

TV series
 Please Tell Me! Galko-chan (2016) (composer)
 Regalia: The Three Sacred Stars (2016) (composer)
 ACCA: 13-Territory Inspection Dept. (2017) (composer)
 Princess Principal (2017) (opening theme performance)
 Code: Realize − Guardian of Rebirth (2017) (composer)
 Classroom of the Elite (2017) (composer)
 Two Car (2017) (composer, ending theme performance)
 Citrus (2018) (composer)
 Arifureta: From Commonplace to World's Strongest (2019–2022) (composer, opening theme performance)
 Special 7: Special Crime Investigation Unit (2019) (composer)
 Argonavis from BanG Dream! (2020) (composer)
 Skate-Leading Stars (2021) (composer)
 SK8 the Infinity (2021) (composer)
 The Vampire Dies in No Time (2021–present) (composer)
 Tribe Nine (2022) (ending theme performance)
 Healer Girl (2022) (composer)
 RWBY: Ice Queendom (2022) (opening theme performance)
 Smile of the Arsnotoria the Animation (2022) (composer with Ken Itō)
 Ningen Fushin: Adventurers Who Don't Believe in Humanity Will Save the World (2023) (composer)
 High Card (2023) (composer)
 World Dai Star (2023) (composer with Kenichi Kuroda and Tatsuya Yano)

Films
 Sing a Bit of Harmony (2021) (composer)

Web series
 Dream Festival! (2016–2017) (composer with Ken Itō)

Notes

References

External links
 

1985 births
21st-century Japanese composers
21st-century Japanese male musicians
Anime composers
Japanese film score composers
Japanese male film score composers
Japanese music arrangers
Japanese television composers
Living people
Male television composers